David Thomson Robb (15 December 1947 – 9 July 2022) was a Scottish footballer who played for Aberdeen, Tampa Bay Rowdies, Norwich City, Philadelphia Fury, Vancouver Whitecaps, Tulsa Roughnecks, Dunfermline Athletic and the Scotland national team.

Career
Davie Robb was born in Broughty Ferry, Dundee in 1947. Affectionately known to Aberdeen supporters as "The Brush", Robb scored 99 goals in 345 appearances with Aberdeen. He scored the winning goal for Aberdeen in the 1976 Scottish League Cup Final. Upon leaving Aberdeen, he played in the US and Canada, and had a short spell at English club Norwich City, before returning to Scotland to play three games for Dunfermline Athletic. He retired from football in 1981 and died in July 2022.

Career statistics

Club

International

Honours
 Scottish Cup: 1969–70
 Scottish League Cup: 1976–77
 NASL Soccer Bowl: 1978 –finalist

References

External links
 
 NASL/MISL stats

1947 births
2022 deaths
People from Broughty Ferry
Scottish footballers
Footballers from Dundee
Association football forwards
Scotland international footballers
Scotland under-23 international footballers
Scottish Football League representative players
Scottish Football League players
English Football League players
North American Soccer League (1968–1984) players
North American Soccer League (1968–1984) indoor players
Major Indoor Soccer League (1978–1992) players
Aberdeen F.C. players
Norwich City F.C. players
Tampa Bay Rowdies (1975–1993) players
Philadelphia Fury (1978–1980) players
Philadelphia Fever (MISL) players
Tulsa Roughnecks (1978–1984) players
Vancouver Whitecaps (1974–1984) players
Dunfermline Athletic F.C. players
Scottish expatriate footballers
Scottish expatriate sportspeople in the United States
Expatriate soccer players in the United States
Scottish expatriate sportspeople in Canada
Expatriate soccer players in Canada